Pyrus syriaca is a deciduous tree in the Rosaceae family. It is referred to by the common name Syrian pear. It is the only pear species which grows in the wild in Lebanon, Turkey, Syria and Israel.

The Syrian pear is a protected plant in Israel. It grows in unsalted ground, usually in Mediterranean scrub, in west Syria, in the Galilee and the Golan.

In the months of March and April, the tree blossoms with white flowers. The fruit ripen in the autumn in the months of September and October. The fruit is edible, though not as good as the European Pear, mostly because of hard, stone like objects found in the skin. The ripe fruit falls to the ground and when it starts to rot, the smell attracts wild boars. The boars eat the fruit and distribute the seeds.

References

External links 
Pyrus syriaca Israel native plants

syriaca
Taxa named by Pierre Edmond Boissier